Wisden (Wisden Cricketers' Almanack) is a reference book published annually in the United Kingdom.

Wisden may also refer to:

Media
Wisden Cricketers' Almanack Australia
Wisden Cricket Monthly (WCM), UK-based print and digital cricket magazine 
Wisden Asia Cricket, monthly cricket magazine
The Wisden Cricketer, cricket monthly magazine
WisdenIndia.com, Wisden.pk and  Wisden.lk, a defunct set of websites which ran from 2012 to 2018 focusing on India, Pakistan and Sri Lanka respectively.

Persons
John Wisden (1826–1884), English cricketer who launched Wisden Cricketers' Almanack
Robert Wisden (born 1958), English actor with career in Canadian and American television

Others
Wisden Group, group of companies formed by John Wisden & Co Ltd, publishers of Wisden Cricketers' Almanack
Wisden Trophy, trophy awarded to the winner of the Test cricket series played between England and the West Indies